The New Hampshire Department of Natural and Cultural Resources (DNCR) is a government agency of the U.S. state of New Hampshire. The main office of DNCR is located in Concord.

History
New Hampshire's Department of Natural and Cultural Resources (DNCR) was established via legislative act on July 1, 2017, as the state combined the Department of Cultural Resources with the Division of Parks and Recreation and the Division of Forest and Lands. The two noted divisions had previously been part of the Department of Resources and Economic Development (DRED), which was dissolved. Other functions within DRED were placed into the Department of Business and Economic Affairs (DBEA), formed at the same time.

DNCR oversees five other state agencies:
New Hampshire Division of Historical Resources
New Hampshire Division of Forests and Lands
New Hampshire Division of Parks and Recreation
New Hampshire State Council on the Arts
New Hampshire State Library

References

External links

Natural and Cultural Resources
Government agencies established in 2017
2017 establishments in New Hampshire